Birse is a parish in the Lower Deeside area of Aberdeenshire, Scotland, which includes the communities of Finzean and Ballogie. However the name Birse is often used to refer only to the northwestern part of the parish which lies on the south side of the River Dee, Aberdeenshire, opposite the village of Aboyne.  The south-west part of the parish is a sparsely populated upland area known as the Forest of Birse, which gives its name to one of the houses at Aboyne Academy.

Etymology and name 
The name Birse was recorded in 1157 as Brass. The origin of the name is uncertain, although toponymist Simon Taylor has suggested derivation from a possible Pictish cognate of the Welsh adjective bras, in names meaning "bulky, large, fertile". However, place-names rarely consist of simplex adjectives.

Images

See also
Corsedardar Hill

References

External links 

 Historical Boundary Map of Birse Parish

Villages in Aberdeenshire
Civil parishes of Scotland